Frederick August Nomens (4 October 1869 – 4 January 1953) was an Australian rules footballer who played with Fitzroy in the Victorian Football League (VFL).

Sources
Holmesby, Russell & Main, Jim (2009). The Encyclopedia of AFL Footballers. 8th ed. Melbourne: Bas Publishing.

 

1869 births
1953 deaths
Australian rules footballers from Victoria (Australia)
Essendon Football Club (VFA) players
Fitzroy Football Club players